Janusz Radziwiłł (2 July 1579 – 3 December 1620) was a noble and magnate of the Polish–Lithuanian Commonwealth. He was the deputy cup-bearer of the Grand Duchy of Lithuania since 1599, the castellan of Vilnius since 1619, and the starost of Borysów. Radziwiłł also held the title of Reichsfürst (Imperial Prince) of the Holy Roman Empire.

He married Zofia Olelkowicz Słucka on 1 October 1600. She died in 1612, and was canonized by the Belarusian Orthodox Church as saint Sofia of Slutsk thanks to her charity and miracles on the grave. Zofia's large estate (seven castles and palaces and some thirty-two villages) contributed to the already significant Radziwłł's wealth. His second marriage was to Elisabeth Sophia of Brandenburg, daughter of John George, Elector of Brandenburg, on 27 March 1613 in Berlin.

It was during Radziwiłł's life that the interests between his family and the Polish Crown began to drift apart, as the Radziwiłłs sought to increase their wealth and power, safeguard Protestantism and support ethnically Lithuanian culture.

In 1606 he joined the opposition against King Sigismund III Vasa and became one of the leaders of the Zebrzydowski's Rokosz. This confederatio, an armed and legal rebellion, was aimed at weakening the king.

Janusz Radziwiłł is one of the characters on the painting by Jan Matejko: Kazanie Skargi (The Sermon of Piotr Skarga).

Notes

External links 
 Anastazja A. Skiepjan, Pogrzeb Janusza Radziwiłła (1579–1620), Klio, Vol 40, No 1 (2017).

1579 births
1620 deaths
People from Vilnius
Secular senators of the Polish–Lithuanian Commonwealth
Polish Calvinist and Reformed Christians
Polish Princes of the Holy Roman Empire
Polish rebels
Lithuanian Calvinist and Reformed Christians
Janusz 1579
17th-century Polish landowners